Alan Bernard Mills (born October 18, 1966) is an American former relief pitcher and pitching coach. He spent 12 seasons in Major League Baseball (MLB) with the New York Yankees (1990–1991), Baltimore Orioles (1992–1998, 2000–2001) and Los Angeles Dodgers (1999–2000). He pitched right-handed.

Early years
Born in Lakeland, Florida, on October 18, 1966, Mills was the youngest of Hugh and Alfreddia Mills' four children. His favorite sport in his youth was football, but he switched to baseball after doctors informed him that he had only one kidney. He graduated from Kathleen High School in 1984. He was an outfielder on the school's varsity team before making the transition to pitcher. He attended Tuskegee University, but transferred to Polk Community College after one year when the former dropped baseball scholarships.

He was selected in the MLB Draft on two occasions in 1986, both times in phases that were discontinued later that year. He was chosen by the Boston Red Sox (13th overall) and California Angels (8th overall) in the first rounds of the regular phase of the January draft and the secondary phase of the June draft respectively. He decided to sign with the Angels over the Red Sox based on which team was willing to finance his final two years of college.

Mills spent just one season with the Salem Angels of the Northwest League, compiling a 6-6 record over fourteen starts, before the Angels sent him to the New York Yankees to complete a December 19, 1986, deal in which the Yankees sent Butch Wynegar to the Angels for Ron Romanick and a player to be named later.

New York Yankees
Mills converted to a relief pitcher during his three seasons in the Yankees' farm system, going 12–24 with a 4.25 ERA and thirteen saves.

He made his major league debut on April 14, pitching 2.2 scoreless innings against the Texas Rangers. Mills went 1–5 with a 4.15 ERA his rookie year splitting his time between the Yankees and triple A Columbus Clippers. For Columbus, he was 3–3 with a 3.38 ERA and six saves.

He was traded to the Baltimore Orioles for a player to be named later during Spring training the following season.

As of 2021, Mills is the only Yankee to wear number 69 in a regular season game.

Baltimore Orioles
Mills emerged as a valuable member of the Orioles' bullpen upon his arrival in Baltimore.

Perhaps the most famous moment of Mills' career came on May 19, when he gave Darryl Strawberry a right cross that bloodied his face in the dugout during a bench clearing brawl with the New York Yankees at Yankee Stadium. Strawberry had just hit Mills' teammate Armando Benítez with a cheap shot during a melee, and Mills promptly defended Benitez by clocking Strawberry point-blank.

The following season, Mills signed as a free agent with the Los Angeles Dodgers. After a season and a half in Los Angeles, he was dealt back to the Orioles for Alberto Reyes. He remained with the Orioles through  before being released. In a 12-season career, Mills posted a 39–32 record with 456 strikeouts and a 4.12 ERA in 474 games.

Mills wore jersey number 75 with the Orioles. Numbers that high are typically only worn by players in spring training (when teams have considerably larger rosters than they do during the regular season). Mills chose to wear it as a motivating factor, to remind himself that his job was not necessarily any more secure than that of someone in spring training should he perform poorly.

Erie SeaWolves
In his first 27 games, he went 23-for-23 in save opportunities, posting a 1.65 ERA and limiting batters to a .154 batting average.

Post-retirement
Mills returned to his alma mater Kathleen High School as a physical education teacher and head coach of its varsity baseball team from 2009 through 2011. It was also during that time that he earned a Bachelor of Arts degree in psychology from Ashford University in 2009. He has also served as a pitching coach in the New York–Penn League for the Oneonta Tigers in 2008.

His return to the Orioles organization in 2012 began a five-year span as pitching coach with the Aberdeen IronBirds (2012–2013), Delmarva Shorebirds (2014) and Bowie Baysox (2015–2016). His 2015 campaign with Bowie was the first time the Baysox captured the Eastern League Championship. After two seasons as the Orioles' bullpen coach in 2017 and 2018, he was announced as the manager of the GCL Orioles on February 8, 2019. Despite the Gulf Coast League cancelling its playoffs due to the threat of Hurricane Dorian, Mills was named Manager of the Year after guiding the Orioles to a league-best 38–15 record in his first full season at the helm. Team records were established or matched in winning percentage (.717) and wins respectively, with the latter tying the 2011 GCL Orioles. On October 4, 2021, Mills was fired by the Baltimore organization.

References

External links

1966 births
Living people
African-American baseball coaches
African-American baseball players
Baltimore Orioles coaches
Baltimore Orioles players
Baseball players from Florida
Bowie Baysox players
Columbus Clippers players
Erie SeaWolves players
Fort Lauderdale Yankees players
Frederick Keys players
Gulf Coast Orioles players
Los Angeles Dodgers players
Major League Baseball bullpen coaches
Major League Baseball pitchers
Minor league baseball coaches
New York Yankees players
Polk State College alumni
Prince William Cannons players
Prince William Yankees players
Rochester Red Wings players
Salem Angels players
Sportspeople from Lakeland, Florida
Tuskegee Golden Tigers baseball players
21st-century African-American people
20th-century African-American sportspeople